Umm Ruweim is an archaeological ruin site  from Ghazali in present-day Sudan. Consisting of two forts and some cemeteries, the site is situated just south of the Nile's Fourth Cataract at Wadi Abu Dom. There are two documented forts of the Meroitic period (300 BC to 300 AD). The Umm Ruweim I measures  and has four towers. Umm Ruweim II,  to the southeast, has a simpler plan consisting only of a perimeter wall. The function of these forts may have been military, but is uncertain. In the vicinity of the sites, there are small cemeteries that have been partially excavated. Umm Ruweim was unknown until the 50s, when its Christian antiquities were surveyed. An ongoing survey by Angelika Lohwasser of the University of Münster since 2009 in the Wadi Abu Dom area includes documentation of the ruins of Umm Ruweim.

References
 H.N. Chittick: "An Exploratory Journey in the Bayuda Region", In Kush 3, 1955 pp. 86-92
 Ossama el-Nur, Hassan Bandi: "The Potential of the IVth Cataract Archaeological Project I: Mound-Graves at Umm Ruweim and Khor al-Greyn", in: Hommages à Jean Leclant. Volume 2: Nubie, Soudan, Éthiopie. Contributions réunies par Catherine Berger, Gisèle Clerc et Nicolas Grimal, Le Caire, Institut Français d'Archéologie Orientale, 1994 = Bibliothèque d'étude, 106/1-4. , pp. 323-331.

Archaeological sites in Sudan
Nubian architecture in Sudan